The 2018–19 Toledo Rockets men's basketball team represented the University of Toledo during the 2018–19 NCAA Division I men's basketball season. The Rockets were led by eighth-year head coach Tod Kowalczyk, and played their home games at Savage Arena, as members of the West Division of the Mid-American Conference. They finished the season 25–8, 13–5 in MAC play to be champions of the West Division. They lost in the quarterfinals of the MAC tournament to Northern Illinois. They received an at-large bid to the National Invitation Tournament where they lost in the first round to Xavier.

Previous season
The Rockets finished the 2017–18 season 23–11, 13–5 in MAC play to win the MAC West division championship. As the No. 2 seed in the MAC tournament, they defeated Miami and Eastern Michigan before losing to Buffalo in the tournament championship. Despite winning 23 games, they did not participate in a postseason tournament.

Offseason

Departures

Incoming transfers

Recruiting class of 2018

Recruiting class of 2019

Roster

Schedule and results

|-
!colspan=9 style=|Exhibition

|-
!colspan=9 style=|Non-conference regular season

|-
!colspan=9 style=| MAC regular season

|-
!colspan=9 style=| MAC tournament

|-
!colspan=9 style=| NIT

|-

Source

References

Toledo
Toledo Rockets men's basketball seasons
Toledo